Admiral Sir Henry Bernard Hughes Rawlings,  (21 May 1889 – 30 September 1962) was a Royal Navy officer who served as Flag Officer, Eastern Mediterranean during the Second World War.

Naval career
Rawlings was born in St Erth, Cornwall, England, on 21 May 1889. Following education at Stubbington House School, Rawlings joined the Royal Navy in 1904 and served in the First World War. After the war he worked for the Foreign Office and undertook Military Missions in Poland. He then commanded the destroyer  and then the cruisers  and  before becoming Naval Attaché in Tokyo in 1936.

Rawlings served in the Second World War, initially commanding the battleship , then commanding the 1st Battle Squadron from 1940 before commanding the 7th Cruiser Squadron from 1941 and becoming Assistant Chief of Naval Staff in 1942. He became Flag Officer, West Africa in 1943 and Flag Officer, Eastern Mediterranean in 1943. He commanded British Task Force 57 in the Pacific from 1944 through the Battle of Okinawa in the spring of 1945, and retired in 1946.

Rawlings died in Bodmin, Cornwall, England, on 30 September 1962.

References

1889 births
1962 deaths
Foreign recipients of the Legion of Merit
Knights Commander of the Order of the Bath
Knights Grand Cross of the Order of the British Empire
People educated at Stubbington House School
People from St Erth
Recipients of the Order of George I
Recipients of the War Cross (Greece)
Royal Navy admirals of World War II
Royal Navy personnel of World War I
Military personnel from Cornwall